Hughes Springs High School is a public high school located in Hughes Springs, Texas (USA). It is classified as a 3A school by the UIL. The school is part of the Hughes Springs Independent School District located in southwestern Cass County. In 2015, the school was rated "Met Standard" by the Texas Education Agency.

Athletics
The Hughes Springs Mustangs compete in the following sports:
American football
Baseball
Basketball
Cross country
Golf
Powerlifting
Softball
Tennis
Track and field
Volleyball

State titles
Boys' basketball - 1971 (2A)
Girls' basketball - 1999 (2A)

References

External links
Hughes Springs ISD

Schools in Cass County, Texas
Education in Cass County, Texas
Public high schools in Texas